"66" is a song by American rapper Lil Yachty featuring fellow American rapper Trippie Redd. It was released as the last track on Lil Yachty's second studio album Lil Boat 2. The song peaked at number 73 on the Billboard Hot 100.

Background 
The track is the first collaboration between Lil Yachty and Trippie Redd.

Music video 
The music video for the track was released on August 16, 2018, and was directed by Drew Kirsch, Mihailo Andic, and Lil Yachty himself. Trace William Cowen of Complex called the video "ominous".

Critical reception 
The track received generally positive reviews. Joshua Minsoo Kim of Spin called the track a highlight off of Lil Boat 2, stating it was mostly great "because of Trippie Redd’s melodic sensibility". Sam Moore of NME called the track "a welcome source of relief from the overbearing raps" on the album, saying that the beat was "the kind of cloud-rap instrumental Yung Lean circa-2013 would’ve felt comfortable throwing his bucket hat on".

Commercial performance 
In less than a week, the song had reached over five million streams on Spotify, twice the amount of streams the track "Baby Daddy" featuring Lil Pump and Offset had. The song debuted and peaked at number 73 on the Billboard Hot 100, and at number 36 on the Hot R&B/Hip-Hop Songs chart.

Charts

Certifications

References 

2018 songs
Songs written by Lil Yachty
Trippie Redd songs
Lil Yachty songs
Songs written by Trippie Redd